Imani Uzuri  is an American vocalist and composer.

Uzuri has collaborated with artists across various disciplines including co-writing and singing the song "Be Still" for Herbie Hancock's album Future 2 Future.

In 2012 Uzuri released her second album, The Gypsy Diaries, which was funded with a Kickstarter campaign. In January 2013, she appeared with the singer Morley at (Le) Poisson Rouge. Uzuri was a 2015 Park Avenue Armory artist-in-residence. March 2016 marked Uzuri's Lincoln Center's American Songbook series debut.

Personal life
Uzuri identifies as bisexual.

References

External links

Year of birth missing (living people)
Living people
Place of birth missing (living people)
Bisexual musicians
Bisexual women
American LGBT singers
LGBT African Americans
American soul singers
African-American feminists
American feminists
African-American women composers
Feminist musicians
American people of Nigerian descent
21st-century African-American women singers